Arazi-ye Qaleh Now (also Romanized as Ārāz̤ī-ye Qal‘eh Now) is a village in Vakilabad Rural District, in the Central District of Arzuiyeh County, Kerman Province, Iran. At the 2006 census, its population was 106, in 25 families.

References 

Populated places in Arzuiyeh County